Holophaea eurytorna is a moth of the subfamily Arctiinae. It was described by George Hampson in 1914. It is found in Colombia.

References

 

Euchromiina
Moths described in 1914